Ross Puritty (born December 18, 1966) is an American former professional boxer. A high-level journeyman and occasional heavyweight contender, Puritty is best remembered for his shocking upset of Wladimir Klitschko in 1998 that won him the WBC international Heavyweight title, as well as for fighting former World Boxing Organization's world Heavyweight champion, Tommy Morrison, to a draw. He also holds fairly notable victories over former world title challengers Jorge Luis Gonzalez and Joe Hipp.

Professional boxing career
Purrity struggled in his early career, losing to Cleveland Woods by technical knockout after being knocked down twice in his second fight.  Through his first six professional fights Puritty had compiled a mediocre record of 3-3, and after thirteen professional fights he was doing even worse, falling to 6-7.  By this time Puritty was considered nothing more than a useful journeyman who could be used as a trial horse for other young heavyweights.  But Puritty was learning the art and science of boxing, and with time and experience his results began to improve.

A July 1994 match against Tommy Morrison, 41-2 at the time, was a turning point in Puritty's career, as he was outlanded and tired out near the end of the fight, but the bout was scored a draw after ten rounds on the strength of Puritty's two knockdowns of Morrison. Puritty then went on a tear, winning his next ten consecutive bouts, all by knockout.  Puritty had made his name and was now considered a top-tier opponent, earning matches against Hasim Rahman and Michael Grant (both of whom beat him), and against Jorge Luis Gonzalez and Joe Hipp, both of whom Puritty beat.  Following the win against Hipp, Puritty was matched against world title contenders Corrie Sanders, Larry Donald, and Chris Byrd, losing all three fights.  Just when it appeared that his time as a contender was ending, Puritty upset the undefeated prospect Mark Hulstrom and the also undefeated future world champion Wladimir Klitschko in just 29 days in late 1998 on his way to a four fight win streak (he won the WBC international Heavyweight title from Klitschko).

Since a draw with Frankie Swindell in January 2000, Puritty has compiled a pedestrian record of just 4-7-2, and his time appears to have passed.  But overall Puritty has salvaged a respectable career as a high-level journeyman and sometime contender for the heavyweight crown, amassing a career record of 31 wins and 20 losses with 27 wins coming by knockout.

Puritty has been generally acknowledged as a fighter with an "iron chin" due to his tremendous ability to absorb punishment. 

Ross Puritty now resides in Wichita, Kansas living with his wife Twila and their five children: Chandler, Tonique, Ross, DeAundre, and Maleak. He works as a salesperson at Lexus of Wichita. 

Puritty has taken under his wing amateur boxers such as national contender Jeffery Page from Andover, Kansas and numerous other amateurs in a team known as Wichita Hard Hitters. Also for a short period he coached the Golden Glove champion Charles Ellis through a short but explosive professional career.

Professional boxing record

References

External links 
 
Ross Puritty Interview

|-

Heavyweight boxers
Living people
1966 births
Sportspeople from Norman, Oklahoma
Boxers from Oklahoma
American male boxers